Dance Of A Thousand Promises is an EP by Australian band Intercooler. It was originally released in October 2004.

Track listing
 "Lovin' And Leavin'"
 "If I Try"
 "Cream Puff"
 "Sugarplum"
 "You're Not Gonna Hurt Us Again"

Notes
All songs written by Phil Ballantyne and Intercooler.
Tracks 1, 3, 4, and 5 produced by Magoo and Intercooler.
Track 2 produced by Paul "Woody" Annison.

References

2004 EPs
Intercooler (band) albums